Stereophile is a monthly American audiophile magazine which reviews high-end audio equipment, such as loudspeakers and amplifiers, and audio-related news.

History
Founded in 1962 by J. Gordon Holt. Stereophile is the highest-circulation hi-fi magazine in the Americas and possibly the world.

In 1998, Stereophile was acquired by Petersen Publishing.

Until 2018, Stereophile was published in New York by The Enthusiast Network, a publisher of special interest magazines. The magazine was formerly based in Santa Fe, New Mexico. During this period it was published eight times a year. until the August 1987 issue, when it started monthly publication. In March 2018, Stereophile was purchased, along with related magazines and websites, by AVTech Media Ltd.

On March 1, 2019, John Atkinson, who had joined the magazine in May 1986, announced that he was stepping down from his position of Editor of Stereophile, that he would continue his association with the magazine as Technical Editor, and that Jim Austin, formerly an editor at Science and a freelance contributor to Stereophile, would be taking over as Editor. Atkinson had edited the magazine since 1986.

Features

Features include their annual "Records to Die For" section, where each editor and writer reviews two outstanding albums of their choice, and the bi-annual "Recommended Components" issue in which audio equipment which has been reviewed in the recent past are classified as "A, B, C or D" level components, with "A" being the most highly recommended.

References

External links 
Stereophile homepage
40 Years of Stereophile: What Happened When (as of 2002)

Professional and trade magazines
Music magazines published in the United States
Monthly magazines published in the United States
Magazines established in 1962
Magazines published in New York City
Magazines published in New Mexico
Mass media in Santa Fe, New Mexico
Eight times annually magazines published in the United States